Somerville is a town in Fayette County, Tennessee, United States. It is part of the Memphis metropolitan area. The population was 3,415 at the 2020 census, up from 3,094 at the 2010 census. It is the county seat of Fayette County.

History
The town was named to honor Lieutenant Robert Somerville, who was killed in 1814 during the Battle of Horseshoe Bend in central Alabama while serving under General Andrew Jackson. Somerville was incorporated in 1836.

Geography
Somerville is located slightly northeast of the center of Fayette County at  (35.237623, -89.358400). U.S. Route 64 runs through the center of town as Fayette Street, leading northeast  to Whiteville and west  to Oakland. Tennessee State Route 76 crosses US 64 at the center of town. North of US 64, it is the town's Main Street and leads  to Brownsville. To the south it is South Street, leading  to Moscow.

The Loosahatchie River, a west-flowing tributary of the Mississippi, runs past the northern end of the town.

Demographics

2020 census

As of the 2020 United States census, there were 3,415 people, 1,187 households, and 734 families residing in the town.

2000 census
As of the census of 2000, there were 2,519 people, 1,006 households, and 618 families residing in the town. The racial makeup of the town was 59.94% White, 39.38% African American, 0.08% Native American, 0.08% Asian, 0.04% from other races, and 0.48% from two or more races. Hispanic or Latino of any race were 0.24% of the population.

There were 1,006 households, out of which 27.9% had children under the age of 18 living with them, 39.3% were married couples living together, 19.8% had a female householder with no husband present, and 38.5% were non-families. 36.9% of all households were made up of individuals, and 19.6% had someone living alone who was 65 years of age or older. The average household size was 2.33 and the average family size was 3.08.

In the town, the population was spread out, with 24.3% under the age of 18, 10.0% from 18 to 24, 24.9% from 25 to 44, 20.0% from 45 to 64, and 20.8% who were 65 years of age or older. The median age was 39 years. For every 100 females, there were 84.7 males. For every 100 females age 18 and over, there were 76.6 males.

The median income for a household in the town was $21,225, and the median income for a family was $29,750. Males had a median income of $26,094 versus $22,768 for females. The per capita income for the town was $15,636. About 18.3% of families and 25.4% of the population were below the poverty line, including 29.0% of those under age 18 and 25.0% of those age 65 or over.

Education
It is in the Fayette County School District.

Notable people
 Chester R. Allen (1905–1972), Major general in the Marine Corps and former Quartermaster General
 Elizabeth Bolden (1890–2006), supercentenarian, world's oldest living person in 2006, died in Memphis
 W. Herbert Brewster (1897–1987), influential African American Baptist minister, composer, dramatist, singer, poet and community leader; he is considered to be one of the fathers of gospel music
 Pearl Dickson (1903–1977), Memphis and country blues singer and songwriter
Sara Beaumont Kennedy (1859–1920), Memphis newspaper editor, writer
 Herb Parsons (1908–1959), considered by many to be the greatest exhibition shooter in history
 Ingram Stainback (1883–1961), territorial governor of Hawaii; born in Somerville
 William L. Wainwright (1947–2012), North Carolina politician
Elvis Presley (1935–1977), his father and he owned a farm here.

References

External links
Town of Somerville official website

Gallery

Towns in Tennessee
Towns in Fayette County, Tennessee
County seats in Tennessee
Memphis metropolitan area